Oi Symmathites (often referred to as Symmathites, english: The Classmates or Classmates) is a Greek television soap opera created by Vicky Alexopoulou and Yorgos Feidas for ANT1. It premiered on October 28, 2014 and concluded on July 28, 2017. Set in Athens, Greece, the show centers upon the life of some classmates 18 years after their graduation and how their lives continue after that.

Production

Development
In 2014, ANT1 was on the hunt to create a new prime time soap opera for its 2014/2015-season. After different proposals they decided to buy the television rights of the Argentine telenovela Graduados, broadcast by Telefe, adapting the project on its greek edition. As the main director of the show was announced Vasilis Thomopoulos, who stopped his long-running collaboration with Mega Channel, and Vicky Alexopoulou as the head writer of the series. ANT1 at first decided to run the show for one and only season with 180 episodes really closely to the original television format.

On May of 2015, shortly before the show was ready to be cancelled, ANT1 decided to renew the show after the agreement of the Argentinian creators because of the high ratings of the first season. Because the original storylines were almost completed the decision between ANT1 and Telefe was to create a new plot and storylines with almost the same characters for the second season of the show. The new head writer, who had to create a almost new series, was Yorgos Feidas. The original storyline of the show, based on the Argentinian Graduados, stops on the episode 170 the 12th episode of the second season.

On March of 2016 ANT1 renewed the show for its third season, continuing the original greek script of Yorgos Feidas.

Cancellation of the series
On March of 2017 the ratings of the show started falling ahead, after almost two years as a slot winner, because of the fifth season of Survivor Greece on Skai TV. On May, ANT1 decided to cancel the show after three seasons even though there was originally an intention to renew the show for a forth season.

Taping
Oi Symmathites was shot at Finos Films Studios in Spata for its entire run.

Theme song
"Oi Symmathites" the theme song of Oi Symmathites, was written by Nikos Moraitis and was performed by Melisses.

Series overview

Plot
Pavlos, Marilena and Vallia were the most popular kids in their school. On the other hand, Andreas, Kristy and Lefteris were into more of a rock lifestyle. The graduation party marked the end of an era for the school friends. Many years later, their paths cross again and they each have an influence on each other's lives.

Cast
Krateros Katsoulis	
Marianna Toumasatou	
Faidra Drouka
Marios Athanasiou	
Dimitris Mavropoulos	
Penelope Anastasopoulou	
Nikoleta Karra	
Anastasia Pantousi	
Mihalis Marinos	
Pavlos Haikalis
Kostas Triantafyllopoulos
Kostas Koklas
Christina Tsafou
Periklis Albanis
Pinelopi Plaka

References

External links

ANT1 original programming
2014 Greek television series debuts
2010s Greek television series
2017 Greek television series endings